Richard Pryke is a British sound engineer. He won an Academy Award for Best Sound for the film Slumdog Millionaire. He has worked on over 80 films since 1993.

Selected filmography
 Bird Box (2018)
 First They Killed My Father (2017)
 Cinderella (2015)
 127 Hours (2010)
 Never Let Me Go
 Nanny McPhee and the Big Bang (2010)
 Nine (2009)
 Slumdog Millionaire (2008)
 Sunshine (2007)
 V for Vendetta (2005)
 Die Another Day (2002)
 Bridget Jones's Diary (2001)
 Conspiracy (2001)
 The World Is Not Enough (1999)
 ''Tomorrow Never Dies (1997)

References

External links

Year of birth missing (living people)
Living people
British audio engineers
Best Sound Mixing Academy Award winners
Best Sound BAFTA Award winners